Mabon may refer to:

Religion and mythology
Mabon, the Autumnal equinox in some versions of the Pagan Wheel of the Year
Mabon ap Modron, a figure in Welsh Arthurian legend
Maponos, a pre-Christian Celtic god
Mabyn or Mabon, an early Cornish saint

People
Willie Mabon (1925–1985), American singer and songwriter
Dickson Mabon (1925–2008), Scottish politician 
William Abraham (trade unionist), also known as Mabon (1842-1922), Welsh politician

Places
Lochmaben, Scotland
Lochmaben Stone, Scotland
St Mabyn, Cornwall
Llanfabon, Caerphilly, Wales
Rhiwabon, Wrexham, Wales